State Road 291 (NM 291) is a  state highway in the US state of New Mexico. NM 291's northern terminus is at NM 68 in Ranchitos, and the southern terminus is in Santa Cruz at NM 583.

Major intersections

See also

References

291
Transportation in Santa Fe County, New Mexico
Transportation in Rio Arriba County, New Mexico